Flash Mob is the fifth album by jazz saxophonist and composer Anton Schwartz on his own Antonjazz label, released in 2014. It received limited press including a feature article in the San Francisco Chronicle
an artist profile in DownBeat magazine

and a feature story on NPR's Morning Edition
as well as positive reviews and a long run on the Jazz Radio Top 10.

Personnel
Anton Schwartz - tenor saxophone
Dominick Farinacci - trumpet
Taylor Eigsti - piano
John Shifflett - bass
Lorca Hart - drums

Production
Producers: Anton Schwartz, Bud Spangler
Engineer: Dan Feiszli
Mixing: Dan Feiszli
Mastering: Paul Stubblebine
Arranger: Anton Schwartz
Graphic design: Dennis Michael Dimos
Photography: Steve Korn

Track listing

References

External links
 Official Anton Schwartz website

2014 albums
Anton Schwartz albums
Instrumental albums